Wici may refer to:

 The formal call letters of a South Carolina Radio Station WWBD.
 Wici (call to arms), a medieval way of calling men to arms in Poland.
Women in Communications, Inc., former name of trade group Association for Women in Communications

See also
WIKI (disambiguation)